Faruk Vražalić (born 22 June 1990) is a Bosnian handball player who plays for RK Bosna Sarajevo and the Bosnian national handball team.

Vražalić signed for Füchse Berlin in August 2015  Vražalić previously played for: RK Bosna Visoko, RK Bosna Sarajevo, Sloga Doboj, Ademar Leon, ThSV Eisenach, RK Vogošća, Füchse Berlin and HBW Balingen-Weilstetten. He is also a member of the Bosnian national handball team. He also won on IHF superglobe with Füchse Berlin.

References

External links 
 

1990 births
Living people
Bosnia and Herzegovina male handball players
Bosnia and Herzegovina expatriate sportspeople in Spain
Bosnia and Herzegovina expatriate sportspeople in Romania
Sportspeople from Sarajevo
People from Visoko